Sandro Brogini (born 20 December 1958) was an Italian decathlete (before was high jumper at a young level), who competed at the 1980 Summer Olympics,

Biography
He was an young promise, just international youth medalist, attended a 22-year Olympic edition, failing to maintain expectations during his senior career.

Personal best
Decathlon: 7644 pts ( Lyngby, 22 June 1980)
100 m: 11.22, long jump: 7.27 m, shot put: 12.95 m, high jump: 2.09 m, 400 m: 51.39;
 110 m hs: 14.90, discus throw: 41.82 m, pole vault: 4.30 m, javelin throw: 56.10 m, 1500 m: 4:23.00

National records
Decathlon: 7644 pts ( Lyngby, 22 June 1980). Record held until 19 June 1988 (broken by Marco Rossi)

Olympic race

National titles
Italian Athletics Championships
Decathlon: 1979, 1981

References

External links
 

1958 births
Athletes (track and field) at the 1980 Summer Olympics
Italian decathletes
Italian male high jumpers
Olympic athletes of Italy
Living people